The Hunchback of Notre-Dame (originally titled Notre-Dame de Paris. 1482) is a French Gothic novel by Victor Hugo, published in 1831. It focuses on the unfortunate story of Quasimodo, the Romani street dancer Esmeralda and Quasimodo's guardian the Archdeacon Claude Frollo in 15th-century Paris. All its elements—Renaissance setting, impossible love affairs, marginalized characters—make the work a model of the literary themes of Romanticism.

The novel has been described as a key text in French literature and has been adapted for film over a dozen times, in addition to numerous television and stage adaptations, such as a 1923 silent film with Lon Chaney, a 1939 sound film with Charles Laughton, and a 1996 Disney animated film with Tom Hulce.

The novel sought to preserve values of French culture in a time period of great change, which resulted in the destruction of many French Gothic structures. The novel made Notre-Dame de Paris a national icon and served as a catalyst for renewed interest in the restoration of Gothic form.

Title
The novel's French title, Notre-Dame de Paris, refers to Notre-Dame Cathedral. Frederic Shoberl's 1833 English translation was published as The Hunchback of Notre-Dame, which became the generally used title in English, referring to Quasimodo, Notre-Dame's bell-ringer.

Background 

Victor Hugo began writing Notre-Dame de Paris in 1829, largely to make his contemporaries more aware of the value of the Gothic architecture, which was neglected and often destroyed to be replaced by new buildings or defaced by replacement of parts of buildings in a newer style. For instance, the medieval stained glass panels of Notre-Dame de Paris had been replaced by white glass to let more light into the church. This explains the large descriptive sections of the book, which far exceed the requirements of the story. A few years earlier, Hugo had already published a paper entitled Guerre aux Démolisseurs (War [declared] on the Demolishers) specifically aimed at saving Paris' medieval architecture. The agreement with his original publisher, Gosselin, was that the book would be finished that same year, but Hugo was constantly delayed due to the demands of other projects. In the summer of 1830, Gosselin demanded that Hugo complete the book by February 1831. Beginning in September 1830, Hugo worked nonstop on the project thereafter.

Legend has it that Hugo locked himself in his room, getting rid of his clothes to write the novel on time, the idea being he couldn't go outside without clothes. However, the validity of the truth of the story has muddled down over time.

Plot
The story is set in Paris in 1482 during the reign of Louis XI. Esmeralda, a beautiful, sixteen-year-old Romani dancer, is the romantic and sexual interest of many men; including Captain Phoebus de Chateaupers; poet Pierre Gringoire; the hunchbacked cathedral bell-ringer Quasimodo, and his guardian Archdeacon Claude Frollo. Frollo is torn between his obsessive lust for Esmeralda and the rules of Notre-Dame Cathedral. He orders Quasimodo to kidnap her, but Quasimodo is captured by Phoebus and his guards. After he saves her, Esmeralda becomes besotted with Phoebus. Gringoire, who attempted to help Esmeralda but was knocked out by Quasimodo, unwittingly wanders into the "Court of Miracles", populated by the Romani and the truands. They are about to hang him for being an outsider, but Esmeralda saves him by agreeing to marry him for four years.

The following day, Quasimodo is sentenced to be flogged and turned on the pillory for two hours, followed by another hour's public exposure. He calls for water. Esmeralda, seeing his thirst, approaches the public stocks and offers him a drink of water. It saves him, and she captures his heart.

Later, Frollo follows Phoebus to an inn where he plans to meet Esmeralda, and watches as Phoebus seduces her. Inflamed with jealousy, Frollo stabs Phoebus. Esmeralda is arrested and charged with the attempted murder of Phoebus and also with witchcraft, and is sentenced to death by hanging. While imprisoned, awaiting her execution, Esmeralda is visited by Frollo. The Archdeacon professes his love for her and promises to help her escape if she reciprocates. However, recognizing him as Phoebus' true attacker, she angrily rebuffs him. As Esmeralda is being led to the gallows, Quasimodo swings down from Notre-Dame and carries her off to the cathedral, temporarily protecting herunder the law of sanctuaryfrom arrest.

Frollo later informs Gringoire that the Court of Parlement has voted to remove Esmeralda's right to sanctuary so she can no longer seek shelter in the cathedral, and will be taken away to be executed. Clopin Trouillefou, the leader of the Romani, hears the news from Gringoire and rallies the Court of Miracles to charge Notre-Dame and rescue Esmeralda.

Quasimodo incorrectly assumes the approaching Romani intend to harm Esmeralda, and drives them off. As Quasimodo defends the cathedral against the invaders, the uproar reaches the king, who is incorrectly informed that those attacking the cathedral are eager for Esmeralda's hanging rather than trying to rescue her. The king orders the authorities to dispatch the invaders and calls for Esmeralda's immediate execution to settle the unrest. In the chaos Esmeralda is taken from the cathedral by Frollo and Gringoire. 

Frollo once again attempts to win Esmeralda's love, but she asserts that she would rather die than be with him. Frollo goes to alert the authorities while trapping Esmeralda with Sister Gudule, a reclusive anchoress who bears an extreme hatred for the Romani as she believes they cannibalized her infant daughter. However, it is revealed that Gudule is really Esmeralda's birth mother, and that Esmeralda is Gudule's long-lost daughter Agnes, abducted and raised by the Romani. The two women's joyous reunion is cut short when the king's men arrive to take Esmeralda to the gallows. A desperate Gudule clings to Esmeralda even as she is taken to the place of execution. The guards pull the old woman off her daughter; and she falls to the pavement and dies from the harsh impact. 

From the tower of Notre-Dame, Frollo and Quasimodo witness as Esmeralda is hanged. Upon observing this, Quasimodo pushes the Archdeacon from the height of cathedral to his death. With nothing left to live for, Quasimodo vanishes and is never seen again.

In the epilogue, a deformed skeleton is found many years later embracing another in the charnel house, implying that Quasimodo had sought Esmeralda among the decaying corpses and laid down to die while holding her. As the guards attempt to pull the skeletons apart, his skeleton crumbles to dust.

Characters

Major
 Esmeralda (born Agnès) is a beautiful 16-year-old Romani street dancer (referred to in the text by the pejorative "Gypsy") who is naturally compassionate and kind. She is the novel's protagonist and the center of the human drama within the story. A popular focus of the citizens' attention, she is the recipient of their changing attitudes, being first adored as an entertainer, then hated as a witch, before being lauded again by Quasimodo. She is loved by Quasimodo, Pierre Gringoire, and Claude Frollo, but falls hopelessly in love with Captain Phoebus. Phoebus is a handsome soldier who she believes will protect her, but in reality simply wants to seduce her. She is one of the few characters to show Quasimodo a measure of human kindness. She is eventually revealed to be not Romani by birth; instead, she was kidnapped by the Romani to "replace" the deformed Quasimodo.
 Quasimodo is a 19-year-old "hunchback" with physical deformities, and the bell-ringer of Notre-Dame. He is half-blind and fully deaf, the latter from all the years ringing the bells of the church. Abandoned by his mother as a baby, he was adopted by Claude Frollo. Quasimodo's life within the confines of the cathedral and his only two outletsringing the bells and his love and devotion for Frolloare described. He rarely ventures outside the Cathedral because the citizens of Paris despise and shun him for his appearance. The notable occasions when he does leave include taking part in the Festival of Fools (which is celebrated on January 6), during which he is elected the Pope of Fools due to his perfect hideousness; his subsequent attempt to kidnap Esmeralda; his rescue of Esmeralda from the gallows; his attempt to bring Phoebus to Esmeralda; and his final abandonment of the cathedral at the end of the novel. It is revealed in the story that the baby Quasimodo was left by the Romani in place of Esmeralda, whom they abducted.
 Claude Frollo, the novel's main antagonist, is the Archdeacon of Notre-Dame. His sour attitude and alchemical experiments have alienated him from Parisians, who believe him to be a sorcerer. His only surviving relative is his dissolute younger brother Jehan, whom he unsuccessfully attempts to reform. Frollo also helps care for Quasimodo. Frollo's numerous sins include lechery, failed alchemy, and other listed vices. His mad attraction to Esmeralda sets off a chain of events leading to Esmeralda's execution.
 Pierre Gringoire is a struggling poet. He mistakenly finds his way into the "Court of Miracles", the domain of the Truands (beggars). In order to preserve the secret location of the Court, Gringoire must either be killed by hanging or marry a Romani. Although Esmeralda does not love him, and in fact believes him to be a coward, she takes pity on his plight and marries him. Touched by her beauty and kindness, Gringoire falls in love with her. But, because she is already in love with Phoebus, much to his disappointment, she will not let him touch her. As time goes on, he grows more fond of Esmeralda's goat Djali than Esmeralda herself, so much so that he chooses to save Djali rather than Esmeralda when Frollo and his guards pursue and kidnap her.
 Captain Phoebus de Chateaupers is the Captain of the King's Archers, and a minor antagonist in the novel. After he saves Esmeralda from abduction, she becomes infatuated with him, and he is intrigued by her. Already betrothed to the beautiful but spiteful Fleur-de-Lys, he wants to seduce Esmeralda nonetheless but is prevented when Frollo stabs him. Phoebus survives, but Esmeralda is taken to be the attempted assassin by all, including Phoebus himself, who no longer wants her. He is condemned to an unhappy married life with Fleur-de-Lys.

Minor
 Clopin Trouillefou is the King of Truands. He sentences Gringoire to be hanged and presides over his "wedding" to Esmeralda. He rallies the Court of Miracles to rescue Esmeralda from Notre-Dame after the idea is suggested by Gringoire. He is eventually killed during the attack by the King's soldiers.
 Mathias Hungadi Spicali, called Duke of Egypt and Bohemia is Esmeralda's protector and second-in-command of the Truands. He knows of her past and gave her an amulet to help find her mother. He is last seen during the riot at Notre-Dame to rescue Esmeralda.
 Jehan Frollo du Moulin (literally "of the mill"), translated in Latin as "Joannes Frollo de Molendino", is Claude Frollo's 16-year-old dissolute younger brother. He is a troublemaker and a student at the university. He is dependent on his brother for money, which he then proceeds to squander on alcohol. After Frollo stops giving him money, Jehan becomes a rogue. When he joins Clopin and his beggars to raid the cathedral, he briefly enters the cathedral by ascending one of the towers with a borrowed ladder. Afterwards he sees Quasimodo and tries to shoot an arrow at his eye, but Quasimodo throws him to his death.
 Fleur-de-Lys de Gondelaurier is a beautiful and wealthy noblewoman engaged to Phoebus. Phoebus's attentions to Esmeralda make her insecure and jealous, and she and her friends respond by treating Esmeralda with contempt and spite. Fleur-de-Lys later neglects to inform Phoebus that Esmeralda has not been executed, which serves to deprive the pair of any further contactthough as Phoebus no longer lusts after Esmeralda by this time, this does not matter. The novel ends with their wedding, but they are said to be condemned to an unhappy marriage.
 Madame Aloïse de Gondelaurier is Fleur-de-Lys' mother.
 Sister Gudule, also known as Sachette and formerly named Paquette Guybertaut "la Chantefleurie", is an anchoress living in seclusion in an exposed cell in central Paris. She is tormented by the loss of her daughter Agnes, whom she believes to have been cannibalised by the Romani as a baby, and devotes her life to mourning her. Her long-lost daughter turns out to be Esmeralda, a fact she discovers only moments before Esmeralda is hanged. Gudule is accidentally killed by one of the King's soldiers while attempting to prevent them from taking her daughter.
 Djali is Esmeralda's pet goat. In addition to dancing with Esmeralda, Djali can do tricks for money, such as tell time, spell Phoebus' name, and do impressions of public figures. Later, during Esmeralda's trial, when Esmeralda is falsely accused of stabbing Phoebus, Djali is falsely accused of being the devil in disguise. At the end of the novel, Djali is saved by Gringoire (who has become fond of the goat during his marriage to Esmeralda) after Esmeralda is captured and hanged.
 Louis XI is the King of France. He appears as an old and sick man, but his personality is very sly and Machiavellian, as well as self-centred. He appears briefly when he is brought the news of the rioting at Notre-Dame. He orders his guard to kill the rioters, and also the "witch" Esmeralda, because of being misinformed about the reason of rioting.
 Tristan l'Hermite is a friend of King Louis XI. He leads the band that goes to capture Esmeralda.
 Henriet Cousin is the city executioner, who hangs Esmeralda.
 Florian Barbedienne is the judge who presides over Quasimodo's case for kidnapping Esmeralda. Barbedienne is deaf, and does not realize Quasimodo is also deaf; thus, he assumes Quasimodo is mocking him by not answering his questions. Barbedienne sentences Quasimodo to be tortured in the public square: one hour of flogging for attempted kidnap, and another hour of public disgrace for (what Barbedienne assumed to be) mocking the judge.
 Jacques Charmolue is Claude Frollo's friend in charge of torturing prisoners. He gets Esmeralda to falsely confess to killing Phoebus. He then has her imprisoned.
 Jacques Coppenole is a man who appears in the beginning of the novel as one of the Flemish guests at the Feast of Fools. He convinces the Parisians to select the Pope of Fools.
 Pierrat Torterue is the torturer at the Châtelet. He tortures Esmeralda after her interrogation, hurting her so badly that she falsely confesses, sealing her own fate. He is also the official who administered the savage flogging that Quasimodo was sentenced to by Barbedienne.
 The unnamed magistrate is the one who presides over Esmeralda's case after she is falsely accused of stabbing Phoebus. He forces her to confess to the crime and sentences her to be hanged in the gallows.
 Robin Poussepain is Jehan Frollo's companion who appears with him during the Feast of Fools and Quasimodo's flogging in the public square.
 Olivier le Mauvais (literally "Olivier the Evil") is King Louis XI's close advisor.
 La Falourdel is the innkeeper of the hotel where Phoebus and Esmeralda meet.
 Marc Cenaine is a magician whom Jacques Charmolue and Claude Frollo torture for practicing witchcraft while they try to pry alchemy secrets from him.
 Bérangère de Champchevrier is Fleur-de-Lys' friend.
 Jacques Coictier is King Louis XI's physician.
 Robert d'Estouteville is the chamberlain to King Louis XI. He is in a foul mood the day Quasimodo is pilloried, not realizing that Quasimodo and the judge on duty are both deaf.
 Colombe is Fleur-de-Lys' friend.
 Lambert Hoctement is a German scholar who, at the beginning of the novel, is tormented by Jehan Frollo and Robin Poussepain.

Major themes

The novel's original French title, Notre-Dame de Paris, indicates that the cathedral itself is the most significant aspect of the novel, both the main setting and the focus of the story's themes. The building had fallen into disrepair at the time of writing, which was something Hugo felt strongly about. The book portrays the Romantic era as one of extremes in architecture, passion, and religion. The theme of determinism (fate and destiny, as set up in the preface of the novel through the introduction of the word "ANANKE") is explored, as well as revolution and social strife.

Architecture
Architecture is a major concern of Hugo's in Notre-Dame de Paris, not just as embodied in the cathedral itself, but as representing throughout Paris and the rest of Europe an artistic genre which, Hugo argued, was about to disappear with the arrival of the printing press. Claude Frollo's portentous phrase, '' ("This will kill that", as he looks from a printed book to the cathedral building), sums up this thesis, which is expounded on in Book V, chapter 2. Hugo writes that '' ("whoever was born a poet became an architect"), arguing that while the written word was heavily censored and difficult to reproduce, architecture was extremely prominent and enjoyed considerable freedom.

With the recent introduction of the printing press, it became possible to reproduce one's ideas much more easily on paper, and Hugo considered this period to represent the last flowering of architecture as a great art form. As with many of his books, Hugo was interested in a time that seemed to him to be on the cusp of two types of society.

The major theme of the third book is that over time the cathedral has been repaired, but the repairs and additions have made the cathedral worse: "And who put the cold, white panes in the place of those windows" and "...who substituted for the ancient Gothic altar, splendidly encumbered with shrines and reliquaries, that heavy marble sarcophagus, with angels' heads and clouds" are a few examples of this. This chapter also discusses how, after repairs to the cathedral after the French Revolution, there was not a significant style in what was added. It seems as if the new architecture is now uglier and worse than it was before the repair.

Literary significance and reception
Hugo introduced with this work the concept of the novel as Epic Theatre. A giant epic about the history of a whole people, incarnated in the figure of the great cathedral as witness and silent protagonist of that history, and the whole idea of time and life as an ongoing, organic panorama centered on dozens of characters caught in the middle of that history. It is the first novel to have beggars as protagonists.

A significant aspect of Notre-Dame de Paris is that it encompasses the whole of life, from the King of France to Paris sewer rats, in a manner later used by Honoré de Balzac, Gustave Flaubert and many others, including Charles Dickens. The enormous popularity of the book in France spurred the nascent historical preservation movement in that country and strongly encouraged Gothic revival architecture. Ultimately it led to major renovations at Notre-Dame in the 19th century led by Eugène Viollet-le-Duc. Much of the cathedral's present appearance is a result of this renovation.

Allusions and references

Allusions to actual history, geography and current science
In The Hunchback of Notre-Dame, Victor Hugo makes frequent reference to the architecture of the Cathedral of Notre-Dame in Paris. He also mentions the invention of the printing press, when the bookmaker near the beginning of the work speaks of "the German pest."

In 2010, British archivist Adrian Glew discovered references to a real-life man called "Hunchback" who was a foreman of a government sculpting studio in Paris in the 1820s who worked on post-Revolution restorations to the cathedral.

Allusions in other works
The name Quasimodo has become synonymous with "a courageous heart beneath a grotesque exterior."

Adaptations
To date, all of the film and TV adaptations have strayed somewhat from the original plot, some going as far as to give it a happy ending, including in the classic 1939 film and the 1996 Disney animated film. The 1956 French film is one of the few versions to end almost exactly like the novel, although it changes other sections of the story. The 1996 Disney version has an ending that is inspired by an opera created by Hugo himself.

Films
 Esmeralda, a 1905 French short silent film
 The Hunchback of Notre Dame, a 1911 silent film
 The Darling of Paris, a 1917 silent film
 Esmeralda, a 1922 British silent film
 The Hunchback of Notre Dame, a 1923 silent film starring Lon Chaney as Quasimodo, directed by Wallace Worsley, and produced by Carl Laemmle and Irving Thalberg
 The Hunchback of Notre Dame, a 1939 sound film starring Charles Laughton as Quasimodo and Maureen O'Hara as Esmeralda, directed by William Dieterle, and produced by Pandro S. Berman
 The Hunchback of Notre Dame, a 1956 French film starring Anthony Quinn as Quasimodo and Gina Lollobrigida as Esmeralda, directed by Jean Delannoy, and produced by Raymond Hakim and Robert Hakim
 The Hunchback of Notre Dame, a 1986 Australian-American fantasy animated film
 The Hunchback of Notre Dame, a 1996 animated film by Walt Disney Feature Animation starring Tom Hulce as the voice of Quasimodo and Demi Moore as the voice of Esmeralda, directed by Kirk Wise and Gary Trousdale and produced by Don Hahn
 The Hunchback of Notre Dame II, a 2002 animated film and sequel of the 1996 film by Walt Disney Feature Animation starring Tom Hulce as the voice of Quasimodo and Demi Moore as the voice of Esmeralda, directed by Bradley Raymond
 The Secret of the Hunchback, a 1996 Direct-to-video animated film by UAV Entertainment
 The Hunchback of Notre Dame, a 1996 Golden Films animated film
 The Hunchback of Notre Dame, a 1996 Jetlag Productions animated film
 The Hunchback of Notre Dame, a 1996 Dingo Pictures animated film
 Quasimodo d'El Paris, a 1999 parody film

Disney has announced that a live-action version of their 1996 animated film is in development.

Television
 The Hunchback of Notre Dame, a 1966 miniseries
 The Hunchback of Notre Dame, a 1976 television film starring Warren Clarke as Quasimodo, Michelle Newell as Esmeralda and Kenneth Haigh as Frollo, directed by Alan Cooke
 The Hunchback of Notre Dame, a 1977 miniseries
 The Hunchback of Notre Dame, a 1982 British-American television film starring Anthony Hopkins as Quasimodo, Lesley-Anne Down as Esmeralda, and Derek Jacobi as Frollo, directed by Michael Tuchner and Alan Hume and produced by Norman Rosemont and Malcolm J. Christopher
 The Magical Adventures of Quasimodo, a 1996 animated series
 The Hunchback, a 1997 television film starring Mandy Patinkin as Quasimodo, Salma Hayek as Esmeralda and Richard Harris as Frollo

Idris Elba is slated to not only play the title character but also to direct and produce music for a modern retelling to be broadcast on Netflix.

Music
 A 1977 lush orchestral disco 28 minute epic re-telling the tale of Quasimodo and Esmeralda, by Alec R. Costandinos and the Syncophonic Orchestra
 The Hunchback of Notre Dame Dennis DeYoung album, a 1996 recording of music written by Styx singer Dennis DeYoung for his musical adaptation of the novel
 The Hunchback of Notre Dame soundtrack for the 1996 Disney film
 A 2016 soundtrack to the musical adaptation, based on the novel and songs from the Disney film version

Ballet 
 La Esmeralda (1844) – choreography by Jules Perrot, music by Cesare Pugni. First performed at Her Majesty's Theatre in London. The ballet has a long performance history in Russia via the revivals of the choreographer Marius Petipa in St. Petersburg throughout the late 19th century.
 Gudule’s Daughter, or Esmiralda (1902) – choreography by Alexander Alexeyevich Gorsky, music by Antoine Simon
 In 1965, a choreography by Roland Petit, first performed by the Paris Opera Ballet.
 IN 1998, a choreography and direction by Michael Pink and original music score by Philip Feeney; currently in the repertoire of Milwaukee Ballet, Boston Ballet, Royal New Zealand Ballet, Atlanta Ballet and Colorado Ballet.
 Ringaren i Notre Dame (The Bellringer of Notre Dame; 2009) – choreography by Pär Isberg and original music score by Stefan Nilsson, first performed on Friday, April 3, by the Royal Swedish Ballet.

Musical theatre
 La Esmeralda, opera by Louise Bertin (1836), libretto by Victor Hugo.
 Esmeralda, opera by Alexander Dargomyzhsky (1847) based on the Victor Hugo novel.
 In 1864, an opera by William Henry Fry with libretto by his brother Joseph Reese Fry based on the Victor Hugo novel. First performance: Academy of Music, Philadelphia, 4 May 1864, conducted by Theodore Thomas.
 Esmeralda, opera by Arthur Goring Thomas (1883), also based on the same Victor Hugo novel.
 Notre Dame, romantic Opera in two acts by Franz Schmidt, text after Victor Hugo by Schmidt and Leopold Wilk; composed: 1902–4, 1st perf.: Vienna 1914.
 In 1993, an Off Broadway musical with music by Byron Janis, lyrics by Hal Hackady and book by Anthony Scully.
In 1993, a dramatic sung-through musical with book and lyrics by Gary Sullivan and music by John Trent Wallace. After a production at the Mermaid Theatre in London it was published by Samuel French Ltd in 1997 and has received several UK productions as well as productions in New Zealand and Australia. In 2010 it was re-written as a conventional musical, with the new title Notre Dame.
El Jorobado de París (1993), an Argentinian sung-through musical with book and lyrics by Pepe Cibrián Campoy and music by Ángel Mahler. Revised versions opened in 1995, 2006 and 2013.
 An operatic melodrama by Zigmars Liepiņš based on the novel.
 In 1998, Notre-Dame de Paris with music by Riccardo Cocciante and lyrics by Luc Plamondon premiered in Paris and became an instant success.
 From 1999 to 2002, the Disney film was adapted into a darker, more Gothic musical production called Der Glöckner von Notre Dame (translated in English as The Bellringer of Notre Dame) in Berlin. A cast recording was also recorded in German. The musical premiered in the United States in 2014.
 A rock musical version was released in Seattle, Washington in 1998 titled "Hunchback" with music and script by C. Rainey Lewis.
 A musical version, scored by Dennis DeYoung, opened in Chicago at the Bailiwick Repertory in the summer of 2008.
 A re-adaptation of the piece entitled Our Lady of Paris, with music and lyrics by David Levinson and book by Stacey Weingarten, was produced in a reading format in Manhattan. It re-sets the action to 1954 at the beginning of the French Algerian conflict. After the first reading, the piece underwent revisions; a second reading was produced in January 2011 under the musical's new title, Les Enfants de Paris.
 Catalyst Theatre's musical adaptation entitled Hunchback was commissioned by The Citadel Theatre and premiered in 2011 in Edmonton and had a subsequent run at the Vancouver Playhouse Theatre in Vancouver in 2012. Book, music and lyrics by Jonathan Christenson from the original novel.

Radio
A 1934 36-part serial adaptation created by George Edwards was broadcast on Australian radio.

John Carradine starred in an hour-long adaptation broadcast on a 1946 episode of Your Playhouse of Favorites.

The book was twice adapted and broadcast on BBC Radio 4's Classic Serial:
 in 5 parts from 6 January to 3 February 1989, with Jack Klaff as Quasimodo
 in 2 parts on 30 November and 7 December 2008, with deaf actor David Bower playing Quasimodo.

Theatre
 In 1861, a "Grand Burlesque Extravaganza" by Henry J. Byron, Esmeralda or, The Sensation Goat, presented at the Royal Strand Theatre in London on 28 September 1861. The piece was revived in 1871 at the same venue, with Harry Paulton as Quasimodo and Rose Cullen as Esmeralda. The programme warned that the burlesque was "founded on, but not to be confounded with, the romance, the opera and the ballet". 
 In 1977, an adaptation by Ken Hill was commissioned and staged by the National Theatre in London.
 In 1978, an adaptation by Robert Hossein opened in Paris.
 In 1997, an adaptation for the stage by Nicholas DeBaubien opened in Paris.
 In 2010, an adaptation by Pip Utton was staged at The Pleasance as part of the Edinburgh Fringe Festival.
 In 2010, an original adaptation by Myriad Theatre & Film was staged in London and then toured South England.
 In 2012, an adaptation by Belt Up Theatre was staged in Selby Abbey.
 In 2013, an adaptation by James Villafuerte was staged in Tanghalang Pasigueño Villa Teatro.
In 2016, a modern adaptation by Harold Hodge, Jr called The Boy in the Church premiered in New York City. This adaptation was set in Alabama during the Great Depression. 
 In 2019, an adaptation by Benjamin Polya was staged by Iris Theatre Company at St Paul's Church, Covent Garden, London.

Comics
Artists like Noel Gloesner, Andrew Dickson, Robin Recht, Tim Conrad, Gilbert Bloch, George Evans Dick Briefer have all created comic strip and book adaptations of The Hunchback of Notre Dame. Paulo Borges, Gustavo Machado and Dan Spiegle have drawn comic strip versions based on the 1996 Disney movie adaptation.

Video games
 Hunchback, a 1983 arcade video game developed by Century Electronics, starring Quasimodo and Esmeralda.
 Timesplitters 2, a 2002 first-person-shooter developed by Free Radical Design, containing a level based on the Notre Dame Cathedral in which the Hunchback is portrayed to be beheading undead zombies using a shotgun.

English language translations
The Hunchback of Notre-Dame has been translated into English many times. Translations are often reprinted in various imprints. Some translations have been revised over time.
 1833. Translated by Frederic Shoberl as The Hunchback of Notre Dame. Later revisions.
 1833. Translated by William Hazlitt as Notre Dame: A Tale of the Ancien Régime. Later revisions.
 1862. Translated by Henry L. Williams as The Hunchback of Notre Dame.
 1882. Translated by A. Langdon Alger as Notre-Dame de Paris.
 1888. Translated by Isabel F. Hapgood as Notre-Dame de Paris.
 1892. Translated by J. Caroll Beckwith as The Hunchback of Notre Dame.
 1895. Translated by M.W. Artois et al., part of the 28-vol The Novels of Victor Hugo, re-printed in the 20th century under other titles.
 1941: Anonymous translation, The Hunchback of Notre Dame for Modern Library
 1956. Translated by Lowell Bair, as The Hunchback of Notre Dame for Bantam Books and included in Bantam Classics
 1964. Translated by Walter J. Cobb. In multiple editions, see for example Signet Classics 
 1978. Translated by John Sturrock. In multiple editions, see for example Penguin Classics 
 1993. Translated by Alban J. Krailsheimer as Notre-Dame de Paris. See Oxford World's Classics 
 2002. Revised translation by Catherine Liu of the 1941 Modern Library translation. See Modern Library Classics 
 2014. Translated by P. Matvei
 2018. Translated by Andrew Primas

See also

References

Notes

Bibliography
 
 Pascal Tonazzi, Florilège de Notre-Dame de Paris (anthologie), Editions Arléa, Paris, 2007, .

External links

 
 The Hunchback of Notre Dame at Internet Archive and Google Books, multiple English translations (scanned books original editions color illustrated)
 , 1888 English translation by Isabel Florence Hapgood (plain text and HTML)
 , 1888 English translation by Isabel Florence Hapgood and French available
 Notre Dame de Paris Harvard Classics
 Notre-Dame de Paris at Wikisource (HTML) 

 
Novels set in the 1480s
1831 French novels
Cathedrals in fiction
French Gothic novels
French novels adapted into films
French novels adapted into plays
Notre-Dame de Paris
Novels about cities
Novels adapted into ballets
Novels adapted into comics
Novels adapted into operas
Novels adapted into radio programs
French novels adapted into television shows
Novels adapted into video games
Novels by Victor Hugo
Novels set in Paris
Novels set in the Middle Ages
Cultural depictions of Louis XI of France